Daiana Micaela Falfán (born 14 October 2000) is an Argentine footballer who plays as a midfielder for Primera División A club UAI Urquiza and the Argentina women's national team.

International career
Falfán made her senior debut for Argentina on 7 November 2019, in a 2–1 away friendly won against Paraguay.

Honors and awards

Clubs
UAI Urquiza
Primera División A: 2018–19

References

External links
 

2000 births
Living people
People from Hurlingham Partido
Sportspeople from Buenos Aires Province
Argentine women's footballers
Women's association football midfielders
Deportivo Morón footballers
UAI Urquiza (women) players
Argentina women's youth international footballers
Argentina women's international footballers